Kalchini railway station is the railway station that serves the town of Kalchini, lying on Doars region in the Indian state of West Bengal.The station lies on New Jalpaiguri–Alipurduar–Samuktala Road line of Northeast Frontier Railway zone, Alipurduar railway division. Major Trains like  Siliguri–Alipurduar Intercity Express Siliguri–Dhubri Intercity Express etc are available from this station.

References

Railway stations in West Bengal
Alipurduar railway division
Railway stations in Alipurduar district